Linum alpinum is a species of perennial plant belonging to the Linaceae family.

Etymology
The Latin genus name Linum means thread, where as the species name alpinum means from the Alps.

Subspecies
Subspecies include:
Linum alpinum subsp. alpinum  Jacq., 1762
Linum alpinum subsp. bertolonii Guarino & Pignatti
Linum alpinum subsp. collinum (Guss. ex Boiss.) J.-M.Tison
Linum alpinum subsp. gracilius (Bertol.) Pignatti
Linum alpinum subsp. julicum (Hayek) Hegi
Linum alpinum subsp. laeve (Scop.) Nyman
Linum alpinum subsp. pirinicum A. Petrova

Distribution and habitat

Description
This plant is glabrous and woody at the base. Sepals are unequal, with three veins at the base, 5–7 mm long. The petals are 12–20 mm long, three-four times longer than sepals. The fruits are capsules 6–8 mm long. Each fruit compartment contains a blackish seed. This species is quite similar to Linum leonii and Linum ockendonii.

Biology
This perennial plant blooms from May to August. The flowers are bent before flowering, where as floral peduncles remain erect after flowering. Typical pollinators are insects (bees, bumblebees, wasps, hoverflies, etc.).

Gallery

References

 Conti F., Abbate G., Alessandrini A., Blasi C., 2005 - An annotated checklist of the Italian vascular flora - Palombi Editori

External links

 Canope-ac Besancon
 Flore Alpes
 Photos of Linum alpinum alpinum

alpinum
Flora of Europe
Plants described in 1762
Taxa named by Nikolaus Joseph von Jacquin